Dowlatabad (also Romanized as Dowlatābād) is a village in Saadatabad Rural District, Pariz District, Sirjan County, Kerman Province, Iran. At the 2006 census, its population was 83, in 23 families.

References 

Populated places in Sirjan County